Leucophosphite is a phosphatic mineral derived from guano (bird or bat excrement).

References

Phosphate minerals